Renate Kasslatter (born 15 January 1980, in Bolzano) is an Italian luger who has competed since 2000. A natural track luger, she won the bronze medal in the women's singles event at the 2009 FIL World Luge Natural Track Championships in Moos, Italy.

Kasslatter also won a silver medal in the women's singles event at the 2008 FIL European Luge Natural Track Championships in Olang, Italy.

References
 FIL-Luge profile

External links
 

1980 births
Living people
Italian lugers
Italian female lugers
Sportspeople from Bolzano
20th-century Italian women
21st-century Italian women